The Stable Salt Reactor (SSR) is a nuclear reactor design under development by Moltex Energy Canada Inc. and its subsidiary Moltex Energy USA LLC, based in Canada, the United States, and the United Kingdom, as well as MoltexFLEX Ltd., based in the United Kingdom.

The SSR design being developed by Moltex Energy Canada Inc. is the Stable Salt Reactor - Wasteburner (SSR-W), which incorporates elements of the molten salt reactor, and aims to have improved safety characteristics (intrinsically safe) and economics (LCOE of $45/MWh USD or less) over traditional light water reactors.

SSRs, which are protected by robust patents, are being designed so that they will not need expensive containment structures and components to mitigate radioactive releases in accident scenarios. The design would preclude the type of widespread radiological contamination that occurred in the Chernobyl or Fukushima accidents, because any hazardous isotopes that might otherwise become airborne would be chemically bound to the coolant. Additionally, the modular design would allow factory production of components and delivery to site by standard road transportation, reducing costs and construction timescales.

The fuel design is a hybrid between light water reactor fuel assemblies and traditional molten salt reactor approaches, in which the fuel is mixed with the coolant. The liquid salt fuel mixture is contained within fuel assemblies that are very similar to current light water reactor technology. The fuel assemblies are then submerged in a pool of liquid salt coolant.

Moltex Energy Canada Inc. plans to deploy the SSR-W and associated waste recycling facility in New Brunswick, Canada in partnership with NB Power. The company has support and funding from the Canadian federal government, the government of New Brunswick, NB Power, Ontario Power Generation, ARPA-E, IDOM, SNC Lavalin.

Technology

The basic unit of the reactor core is the fuel assembly. In the SSR-W, each assembly contains nearly 300 fuel tubes of 10 mm diameter, filled to a height of 1.8 m with fuel salt. The tubes have “diving bell” gas vents at the top to allow fission gases to escape. The assemblies are loaded vertically into the core, with fresh assemblies entering through an airlock and inserted into the core through a fuelling machine.

Fuel and materials
The fuel in the SSR is two-thirds sodium chloride (table salt) and one-third mixed lanthanide/actinide trichlorides. Fuel for the initial reactors is planned to come from converted spent nuclear fuel from existing conventional reactors. In the UK, the fuel could come from the stocks of civil plutonium dioxide from PUREX downblended and converted to chloride impurities added to reduce any proliferation concerns.

Trichlorides are more thermodynamically stable than the corresponding fluoride salts, and can therefore be maintained in a strongly reducing state by contact with sacrificial nuclear-grade zirconium metal added as a coating on, or an insert within, the fuel tube of the SSR-W. As a result, using this patented approach, the fuel tube can be made from standard nuclear certified steel without risk of corrosion. Since the reactor operates in the fast spectrum, the tubes will be exposed to very high neutron flux and so will suffer high levels of radiation damage estimated at 100–200 dpa over the tube life. The highly neutron damage tolerant steel, PE16 will therefore be used for the tubes. Other steels with fast-neutron tolerance (such as T9, NF616 and 15-15Ti) could also be used depending on the local supply chain capabilities.

The average power density in the SSR-W fuel salt is 150 kW/L, which allows a large temperature margin below the boiling point of the salt.

Coolants
The coolant salt in the SSR-W reactor tank is a chloride-based coolant salt. The coolant also contains an agent to reduce its redox potential, making it virtually non-corrosive to standard types of steel. The reactor tank, support structures and heat exchangers can therefore be built with standard 316L stainless steel.

The coolant salt is circulated through the reactor core by three pumps attached to the heat exchangers in each module. Flow rates are modest (approximately 1 m/s) with a resulting low requirement for pump power. Redundant engineering would allow operation to continue in the event of a pump failure.

Safety
SSRs are designed with intrinsic safety characteristics being the first line of defence. No operator or active system is required to maintain the reactor in a safe and stable state. The following are primary intrinsic safety features of the SSR.

Reactivity control 
As the SSR is self-controlling, no mechanical control is required. This is made possible by the combination of a high negative temperature coefficient of reactivity and the ability to continually extract heat from the fuel tubes. As heat is taken out of the system the temperature drops, causing the reactivity to go up. Conversely, when the reactor heats up, reactivity decreases. This provides security against all overpower scenarios, such as a reactivity insertion accident. For the SSR-W, diverse and redundant safety is also provided by an array of gravitationally driven boron carbide control rods.

Non-volatile radioactive material
Use of molten salt fuel with the appropriate chemistry eliminates the hazardous volatile iodine and caesium, making multi-layered containment unnecessary to prevent airborne radioactive plumes in severe accident scenarios. For the SSR-W, the noble gases xenon and krypton would leave the reactor core in normal operation, but would be trapped until their radioactive isotopes decay, so there would be very little that could be released in an accident.

No high pressures
In a water-cooled reactor, high internal pressures provide a driving force for dispersion of radioactive materials in the event of an accident. In contrast, molten salt fuels and coolants have boiling points far above the SSR's operating temperature. So, its core runs at atmospheric pressure. Physical separation of the steam-generating system from the radioactive core, by means of a secondary coolant loop, eliminates high pressure within the reactor. High pressures within fuel tubes are also avoided by venting off fission gases into the surrounding coolant salt.

Low chemical reactivity
Zirconium in pressurized water reactors and sodium in fast reactors both create the potential for severe explosion and fire risks. No chemically reactive materials are used in the SSR.

Decay heat removal
Immediately after a nuclear reactor shuts down, almost 7% of its previous operating power continues to be generated, from the decay of short half-life fission products. In conventional reactors, removing this decay heat passively is challenging because of the reactors’ low temperatures. An SSR operates at much higher temperatures; so, this heat can be rapidly transferred away from the core. In the event of a reactor shutdown and failure of all active heat-removal systems in the SSR, decay heat from the core would dissipate into air-cooling ducts around the perimeter of the tank that operate continually. This is known as the Emergency Heat Removal System. The main heat-transfer mechanism is radiative. Heat transfer goes up substantially with temperature; so, it is negligible at operating temperatures but sufficient at higher-temperature accident conditions. The reactor components are not damaged during this process and the plant can be restarted afterwards.

Consumption of nuclear waste
Most countries that use nuclear power plan to store spent nuclear fuel deep underground until its radioactivity has reduced to levels similar to that of natural uranium. As the SSR-W consumes nuclear waste, the countries could use them to reduce the volume of waste that ends up in long-term storage. 

Operating in the fast spectrum, the SSR-W is effective at transmuting long-lived actinides into more stable isotopes. Today’s reactors that are fuelled by reprocessed spent fuel need very high-purity plutonium to form a stable pellet. The SSR-W can have any level of lanthanide and actinide contamination in its fuel, so long as it can still go critical. This low level of purity greatly simplifies the recycling method for existing waste.

The well established recycling method is based on pyroprocessing. A 2016 report by the Canadian Nuclear Laboratories on recycling of CANDU fuel estimates that pyroprocessing would cost about half as much as more conventional reprocessing. Pyroprocessing for the SSR-W uses only one third of the steps of conventional pyroprocessing, which will make it even cheaper. It is potentially competitive with the cost of manufacturing fresh fuel from mined uranium.

Waste from the SSR-W will take the form of solid salt in tubes. This can be vitrified and stored underground for over 100,000 years, as is planned today, or it can be recycled. In that case, fission products would be separated out and safely stored at ground level for the several hundred years needed for them to decay to radioactivity levels similar to that of uranium ore. The troublesome long-lived actinides and the remaining fuel would go back into the reactor, where they could be burned and transmuted into more-stable isotopes.

Other stable salt reactor designs
Stable salt reactor technology is highly flexible and can be adapted to several different reactor designs. The use of molten salt fuel in standard fuel assemblies allows stable salt versions of many of the large variety of nuclear reactors considered for development worldwide. The industry’s focus today however is to allow rapid development and roll out of low-cost reactors.

Another design now in development, by MoltexFLEX Ltd., is the FLEX reactor, a thermal spectrum SSR fuelled by low-enriched uranium (around 6%). The FLEX reactor may be more suited to nations without an existing nuclear fleet and concerns about waste. It is moderated with graphite as part of the fuel assembly and has significant peaking plant capabilities.

Moltex Energy Canada Inc., Moltex Energy USA LLC and MoltexFLEX Ltd. have also conceptualized a thorium breeding version of the SSR (SSR-Th). This reactor would contain thorium in the coolant salt, which could breed new fuel. Thorium is an abundant fuel source that can provide energy security to nations that do not have their own uranium reserves. 

With this range of reactor options and the large global reserves of uranium and thorium available, SSRs could fuel the planet for several thousands of years.

Economics
The capital cost of the SSR-W was estimated at $1,950/kW USD by an independent UK nuclear engineering firm. For comparison, the capital cost of a modern pulverized coal power station in the United States is $3,250/kW and the cost of large-scale nuclear is $5,500/kW. Further reductions to this cost are expected for modular factory-based construction.

This low capital cost results in a levelised cost of electricity (LCOE) of $44.64/MWh USD with substantial potential for further reductions, because of the greater simplicity and intrinsic safety of the SSR.

Given the pre-commercial nature of the technology, the figures for capital cost and LCOE are estimates, and may increase or decrease during completion of the development and licensing processes.

The International Energy Agency predicts that nuclear power will maintain a constant small role in the global energy supply, with a market opportunity of 219 GWe up to 2040. With the improved economics of the SSR, Moltex Energy predicts that it has the potential to access a market of over 1,300 GWe by 2040.

Development
The fundamental patent on the use of unpumped molten salt fuel was granted to Moltex Energy Ltd in 2014, and further implementation-related patents have been applied for and granted since.

The SSR-W has completed Vendor Design Review Phase 1 review with the Canadian Nuclear Safety Commission. Both the US and Canadian governments are supporting development of elements of the SSR technology.

Moltex Energy Canada Inc. plans to build, by the early 2030s, a demonstration SSR-W at the Point Lepreau nuclear power plant site in Canada under an agreement signed with NB Power.

Recognition
As well as the selection for development support by the US and Canadian governments noted above, the SSR has been identified as a leading SMR technology by a 2020 Tractebel analysis, and the SSR-W was selected as one of two SMR candidates for further progression by NB Power, out of a field of 90 candidates. It was also selected as part of the UK government's Phase 1 Advanced Modular Reactor competition but was not selected for the Phase 2 part of the funding.

References

External links 

 Stable Salt Reactor Technology Introduction, YouTube video
 Modular Stable Salt Reactors – a simpler way to use molten salt fuel – Ian Scott Moltex Energy

Nuclear power reactor types
Nuclear power
Molten salt reactors